Colt in the Hand of the Devil (also known as Devil Was an Angel and An Angel with a Gun Is a Devil) is a 1967 Italian Spaghetti Western film  written and directed by Sergio Bergonzelli. The theme song "The Devil Was an Angel" is performed by Mino Reitano. It was shot in Sardinia.

Cast 

 Bob Henry as Pat Scotty
Marisa Solinas as  Maya
George Wang as  El Condor/Capataz
 Lucretia Love as  Jane
 Gerardo Rossi as Tenente Dick Carson
Luciano Catenacci as  El Loco
 Luciano Benetti as  Cpt. McDonald

References

External links

Spanish Western (genre) films
Spaghetti Western films
1967 Western (genre) films
1967 films
Films directed by Sergio Bergonzelli
Films with screenplays by Sergio Bergonzelli
1960s Italian films